Skåde is a neighbourhood of Højbjerg, a southern district of Aarhus in Denmark. It is located 6 km south from the city centre.

Skåde is the highest lying area in Aarhus municipality, with hills like Jelshøj (128 metres) and Søsterhøj (112 metres).

Description 
The built up area of Skåde is almost exclusively residential, but the neighbourhood also comprise a larger part of the Marselisborg Forests, known as Skåde Skov. Skåde Skov includes the park like area of Hørhaven. The Moesgård estate is also situated in Skåde and comprise the Moesgård Manor, Moesgård Museum, the forest area of Moesgård Skov, and Moesgård beach.

Notable points of interest in Skåde includes:

 Skåde BakkerLarger affluent residential area with large mansions.
 Handelsfagskolen Kursuscenter Course center near Søsterhøj with vocational courses and training in the fields of trade and commerce.Notable brutalist architecture designed by Friis & Moltke in 1969. 
 Aarhus EfterskoleAn efterskole since 1978.
 Diakonhøjskolen (Deaconal Folk High School) 
 Skattecenter AarhusMunicipal tax centre.
 SøsterhøjA hilltop with a landmark radio and TV antenna.
 JelshøjThe highest hill in the municipality.
 Skåde SkovPart of the Marselisborg Forests.
 HørhavenA park like area of Skåde Skov.
 Moesgård Museum
 Moesgård Manor
 Moesgård Forest Mill
 Moesgård BeachPopular destination in the summer.

History 
Skåde was originally a small village in the Aarhus countryside, but has now merged with the city. The administrative division of Skåde has been enlarged several times since the late 1800s.

Gallery

References

Sources 
 Højbjerg Holme Lokalhistoriske Arkiv Archive on local history

External links 

Neighborhoods of Aarhus